Guaranty Building can refer to:

 Guaranty Building (Hollywood, California)
 Guaranty Building (West Palm Beach, Florida)
 Prudential (Guaranty) Building (Buffalo, New York)